Chlorococcaceae is a family of green algae, in the order Chlamydomonadales.

List of genera

 Apodochloris
 Bracteacoccus
 Chlorococcopsis
 Chlorococcum
 Chlorohippotes
 Chlorotetraedron
 Closteridium
 Coccomyxa
 Cystomonas
 Desmatractum
 Emergococcus
 Emergosphaera
 Ettlia
 Fasciculochloris
 Ferricystis
 Follicularia
 Heterotetracystis
 Korshikoviella
 Neochloris
 Neospongiococcum
 Octogoniella
 Oophila
 Phaseolaria
 Poloidion
 Pseudodictyochloris
 Pseudoplanophila
 Pseudospongiococcum
 Pseudotetracystis
 Pseudotrochiscia
 Schroederia
 Skujaster
 Spongiochloris
 Sykidion
 Tetracystis
 Tetraedron
 Trochisciopsis
 Valkanoviella

References

External links

Chlorophyceae families